Gustav Jahoda, FBA, FRSE (11 October 1920 – 12 December 2016) was an Austrian psychologist and writer.

He was educated in Vienna, then subsequently in Paris and London. He studied sociology and psychology at London University before obtaining a lectureship in social psychology at the University of Manchester. In 1952 he took up a post at the University College of the Gold Coast (now Ghana) in the Department of Sociology, where he carried out pioneering research into cross-cultural psychology.

In 1963, Gustav Jahoda was invited to set up a new psychology department in the University of Strathclyde, although he continued to make field trips to West Africa. He retired in 1985.

He published works on cross-cultural psychology, socio-cognitive development and history of the social sciences. He also published more than 200 articles. Jahoda was elected fellow of the British Academy in 1988 and fellow of the Royal Society of Edinburgh in 1993.

Publications 
A History of Social Psychology: From the Eighteenth-Century Enlightenment to the Second World War (2007)
Images of Savages: Ancient Roots of Modern Prejudice in Western Culture (1999)
Crossroads Between Culture and Mind: Continuities and Change in Theories of Human Nature (1993)
Psychology and Anthropology: A Psychological Perspective (1982)
The Psychology of Superstition (1970)
White Man: A Study of the Attitudes of Africans to Europeans in Ghana before Independence (1961)

References 

1920 births
2016 deaths
Alumni of the University of London
Anomalistic psychology
Austrian psychologists
Cross-cultural psychology
Critics of parapsychology
Academics of the University of Strathclyde
Fellows of the British Academy
Fellows of the Royal Society of Edinburgh
Austrian expatriates in France
Austrian emigrants to the United Kingdom